Přítluky is a municipality and village in Břeclav District in the South Moravian Region of the Czech Republic. It has about 800 inhabitants.

Administrative parts
The village of Nové Mlýny is an administrative part of Přítluky. Nové Mlýny forms an exclave of the municipal territory.

Geography

It lies on the Lower Morava Valley.

Přítluky lies on the left bank of the Thaya river. The village of Nové Mlýny lies on shores of the Nové Mlýny reservoirs, named after the village.

History
The first written mention of Přítluky is from 1222, when the parish church was mentioned.

Economy
Přítluky is known for viticulture. The municipality lies in the Velkopavlovická wine subregion.

Sights
The landmark of the municipality is the Church of Saint Margaret. The current structure was built in 1784 and has preserved Gothic elements from the older church. The church has a separate tower which was built in 1765.

References

External links

Villages in Břeclav District